Sigma Pi Alpha Sorority, Inc. is a Chicana/Latina-based, Greek letter, intercollegiate sorority founded in 1996 at the University of California, Berkeley. Although Sigma Pi Alpha is a Chicana Latina organization by tradition, membership is open to all college females. A sister of Sigma Pi Alpha is also known as an ELLA or a Sigma.

History 
Sigma Pi Alpha was established in 1996 at the University of California, Berkeley, and has expanded to other locations in California. The sorority is not part of the Greek Panhellenic System. It is a non-profit grassroots organization and does not affiliate with any national fraternity or sorority council. It is governed by its own direct National Council.

Symbols 
The letters worn by sisters represent their sisterhood, their commitment to each other, and their goals. The Greek letters were specifically selected by the sorority's five founding mothers to symbolize their Chicana/Latina heritage by spelling ELLA, meaning she/her in the Spanish language.

Goals 
1. To enhance Chicana/Latina heritage within the sorority.

2. To be involved within the campus and our communities.

3. To promote higher education in future generations.

4. To address academics, sisterhood, and personal and individual needs.

5. To create a sisterhood in which we can communicate and express ourselves with trust and security.

6. To form a sisterhood where we can receive support and a commitment that will last a lifetime.

7. To follow a code of conduct representative to us as a sorority and Chicana/Latina women.

Chapters 
Undergraduate chapters are present at the following schools. Active chapters are indicated in bold. Inactive chapters are indicated in italic. There is also a local sorority Sigma Pi Alpha that was founded in 1991 at Central Methodist University in Fayette, Missouri. This sorority is not Chicana/Latina based and has no association with the others.

References

Student organizations established in 1996
Student societies in the United States
Hispanic and Latino organizations
Latino fraternities and sororities
1996 establishments in California